The Coppa Italia is the national ice hockey cup in Italy. It was first played in 1973.

Winners
1973: Sportivi Ghiaccio Cortina
1974: Sportivi Ghiaccio Cortina
1991: Associazione Sportiva Asiago Hockey
1998: HC CourmAosta
2000–01: Associazione Sportiva Asiago Hockey
2001–02: Associazione Sportiva Asiago Hockey
2002–03: Hockey Club Junior Milano Vipers
2003–04: Hockey Club Bolzano
2004–05: Hockey Club Junior Milano Vipers
2005–06: Hockey Club Junior Milano Vipers
2006–07: Hockey Club Bolzano
2007–08: Sport Ghiaccio Pontebba
2008–09: Hockey Club Bolzano
2009–10: AS Renon
2010–11: HC Pustertal
2011–12: Sportivi Ghiaccio Cortina
2012–13: HC Valpellice
2013–14: AS Renon
2014–15: AS Renon
2015–16: HC Valpellice
2016–17: Hockey Milano Rossoblu
2017–18: Hockey Milano Rossoblu
2018–19: SV Kaltern
2019–20: HC Merano

Titles by team
 SG Cortina (3): 1973, 1974, 2011–12
 HC Bolzano (3): 2003–04, 2006–07, 2008–09
 Asiago Hockey (3): 1991, 2000–01, 2001–02
 HC Milano Vipers (3): 2002–03, 2004–05, 2005–06
 AS Renon (3): 2009–10, 2013–14, 2014–15
 HC Valpellice (2): 2012–13, 2015–16
 Hockey Milano Rossoblu (2): 2016–17, 2017–18
 SG Pontebba (1): 2007–08
 HC Courmaosta (1): 1998
 HC Pustertal (1): 2010–11
 SV Kaltern (1): 2018–19
 HC Merano (1): 2019–20

References
 Italian Ice Hockey Federation

Ice hockey competitions in Italy
Ital